Tramps Like Us is the 2004 album by Kacy Crowley. It was released independently. Like her previous album, Moodswing, it is popular in Crowley's hometown of Austin, Texas.

Track listing 

 "Badass"
 "Barely Hanging On"
 "Nameless Town"
 "Sinners Hallelujah"
 "Holding in the World"
 "Goddamn Angel"
 "Downtime"
 "Kimberly"
 "Breakdown Lane"
 "Paydirt"
 "Boss"

References

2004 albums
Kacy Crowley albums